The 1960 United States presidential election in Rhode Island took place on November 8, 1960, as part of the 1960 United States presidential election, which was held throughout all 50 states. Voters chose four representatives, or electors to the Electoral College, who voted for president and vice president.

Rhode Island voted for the Democratic nominee, Senator John F. Kennedy of Massachusetts, over the Republican nominee, Vice President Richard Nixon of California. Kennedy ran with Senate Majority Leader Lyndon B. Johnson of Texas, while Nixon's running mate was Ambassador Henry Cabot Lodge, Jr. of Massachusetts.

Kennedy carried Rhode Island by a margin of 27.27%, making it his strongest state.

Results

By county

By Municipality

See also
 United States presidential elections in Rhode Island

References

Rhode Island
1960
1960 Rhode Island elections